John Charters Boyle (1870 or 1871–1950) was a unionist politician in Northern Ireland.

Boyle studied at Cheltenham College and the Royal Indian Engineering College, before working as a surveyor.  In 1937, he was elected to the Senate of Northern Ireland as an Ulster Unionist Party representative, despite having no previous political experience.  He served until his death in 1950.

References

1870s births
Alumni of the Royal Indian Engineering College
1950 deaths
Members of the Senate of Northern Ireland 1937–1941
Members of the Senate of Northern Ireland 1941–1945
Members of the Senate of Northern Ireland 1945–1949
Members of the Senate of Northern Ireland 1949–1953
People educated at Cheltenham College
Ulster Unionist Party members of the Senate of Northern Ireland